The Schimeck Family (German: Familie Schimek) is a 1935 German comedy film directed by E.W. Emo and starring Hans Moser, Käthe Haack and Hilde Schneider. It was shot at Johannisthal Studios in Berlin. The film's sets were designed by the art directors Karl Böhm and Heinrich Richter. It is based on the play The Schimek Family by Gustaf Kadelburg, previously adapted into a 1926 silent film and later into a 1957 Austrian film.

Synopsis
In Berlin in 1908, after the death of their father three children go to live with their aunt and uncle.

Cast
 Hans Moser as 	Ludwig Schigl
 Käthe Haack as 	Frau Schimek
 Hilde Schneider as 	Hedwig, ihre Nichte
 Hans Adalbert Schlettow as Franz Baumann, Tischlergeselle
 Grethe Weiser as Cilli Kaltenbach
 Fritz Odemar as 	Anton Kaltenbach
 Cecile Gehlers as 	Ilse, Cillis Freundin
 Wilhelm Bendow as 	Weigel, Kaltenbachs Kompagnon
 Eduard von Winterstein as Gerichtsvorsitzender
 Heinrich Schroth as Der Staatsanwalt
 Philipp Manning as Der Justizrat
 Hans Sternberg as 	Friesecke, Droschkenkutscher
 Günther Großkopf as 	Willi, Hedwigs Neffe
 Horst Teetzmann as 	Franzl, Hedwigs Neffe
 Egon Brosig as 	Tänzer
 Ernst Reißig a Pasternak, Theaterportier
 Margarete Hoffmann as	Garderobiere

References

Bibliography 
 Bock, Hans-Michael & Bergfelder, Tim. The Concise CineGraph. Encyclopedia of German Cinema. Berghahn Books, 2009.
 Klaus, Ulrich J. Deutsche Tonfilme: Jahrgang 1935. Klaus-Archiv, 1988.
 Rentschler, Eric. The Ministry of Illusion: Nazi Cinema and Its Afterlife. Harvard University Press, 1996.
 Waldman, Harry. Nazi Films in America, 1933–1942. McFarland, 2008.

External links 
 

1935 films
Films of Nazi Germany
German comedy films
1935 comedy films
1930s German-language films
Films directed by E. W. Emo
Tobis Film films
Films shot at Johannisthal Studios
1930s German films
Films set in Berlin
Films set in 1908
German historical films
1930s historical films